Leucophanite is an inosilicate mineral with the chemical formula . It may contain cerium substituting in the calcium position. 

It occurs in pegmatites and alkali igneous complexes as yellow, greenish or white triclinic crystals and has been found in Norway, Quebec and Russia.

It was first described from the Langesundfiord district of southern Norway in 1840.

References

Sodium minerals
Calcium minerals
Beryllium minerals
Inosilicates
Fluorine minerals
Orthorhombic minerals
Minerals in space group 19